Nowy Targ  (Officially: Royal Free city of Nowy Targ, Yiddish: Naymark, Goral Dialect: Miasto) is a town in southern Poland, in the Lesser Poland Voivodeship. It is located in the Orava-Nowy Targ Basin at the foot of the Gorce Mountains, at the confluence of the Czarny Dunajec and the Biały Dunajec. It is the seat of the Nowy Targ County and the rural Gmina Nowy Targ, as well as the Tatra Euroregion.

With 33,293 inhabitants, Nowy Targ is the largest town and the historic capital of Podhale, as well as its main commercial, communication and industrial center.

The town has the Podhale State Vocational University and the highest located airport in Poland.

Established before 1233, Nowy Targ received city rights on June 22, 1346 from King Casimir the Great. The historic architectural and urban complex of the town with a medieval market square has been preserved to this day.

Toponymy 

Nowy Targ was a royal town of the Crown of the Kingdom of Poland and was granted staple right in 1638.

During the foundation period, the town was called the German name , and during the Austrian partition it was called  by local Jews.

Timeline of town history
 1308 - Cistercians receive a land grant to form new settlements in the mountain region. A border settlement called Stare Cło is founded soon thereafter.
 1346 - Nowy Targ founded by King Casimir the Great, based on the Stare Cło settlement, and granted significant internal autonomy based on Magdeburg law.
 1487 - King Casimir IV Jagiellon grants the rights to two annual festivals, and a weekly market fair on Thursdays. (The weekly open-air market continues to this day, now on Thursday and Saturday mornings.)
 1533 - Nowy Targ obtains a statute requiring merchants to pass through the city when crossing the border.
 1601 - Great fire destroys the parochial church and city records.
 1656 - Swedish troops sack the town during the Deluge.
1670 The Battle of Nowy Targ occurs ending the Peasant Rebellion in Podhale of Gorals
 1710 - Another fire consumes 41 houses and the church.
 1770 - Nowy Targ annexed by Austria (see: Partitions of Poland).
 1886 - City Hall opens.
 1914 - Vladimir Ilyich Lenin is arrested as a possible spy in southern Poland by Austrian authorities; he is jailed in Nowy Targ for approximately 12 days.
 1918-1920 - The region becomes part of the Lemko Republic after World War I.
 1933 - Polish president Ignacy Mościcki visits.
 1939 - German forces invade on 1 September, at approx. 16:30.
 1941 - Resistance movement called the Tatra Confederation formed in Nowy Targ.
 1942 - Jewish ghetto liquidated by Nazis on 30 August.
 1945 - The Red Army forces out German occupants on 29 January. 4 Jewish Holocaust survivors who return to the town are being murdered by locals and the rest flee.
 1966 - Born Wojciech Wiercioch, Polish writer.
 1979 - Pope John Paul II visits Nowy Targ on 8 June, during his first pilgrimage to Poland.

Geography
Nowy Targ is located in the heart of Podhale (one of the Goral Lands) at the altitude of 585–850 m above sea level (AMSL); latitude 49°28' N, longitude 20°01' E. Distance to the main urban agglomerations in Poland is: Warsaw – , Łódź – , Kraków – , Gdańsk – , Wrocław – , Katowice – , Kielce – , Rzeszów – , Szczecin – , Białystok - , Poznań – , Częstochowa – , Słupsk – .

Climate
Due to its altitude, Nowy Targ is one of the coldest cities in Poland together with Suwałki and Zakopane. Winter usually lasts from late November to early April and between 90 and 110 days a year there is a snow cover. Air frost has been measured in every month of the year except for July. Summers are mild with occasional thunderstorms and high temperatures between 17 and 25 degrees Celsius. Hot days (over ) are rare, only occurring twice annually on average. The growing season equally varies between on average 150 days on Bukowina Miejska to around 200 days in the lower parts of the city. Nowy Targ is in the AHS Heat Zones 1-2 and USDA Hardiness Zone 4a to 5b, depending on the location.

According to the Köppen climate classification, Nowy Targ straddles the border of the Warm Summer Continental (Dfb) and Subarctic (Dfc) climates, with most of the city falling in the Dfb group. The Dfc climate is only found above of elevation within Nowy Targ.

Culture

 City Cultural Center (Miejski Ośrodek Kultury)
 Youth Cultural Center (Młodzieżowy Dom Kultury)
 The Jatka Gallery (Galeria Jatki)

Museums
 Museum of Podhale (Muzeum Podhalańskie PTTK)

Cinemas
 Cinema "Tatry"

Architecture

St. Anna Church

Wooden church overseeing the city cemetery. Its origins date to the 15th century, although local legends describe it as founded in 1219.

Initially built in a gothic style, it was later repaired and rebuilt featuring, among others, a baroque altar piece and paintings, a rococo pulpit, and 18th-century organ and bell tower.

St. Catherine Church

Dedicated to St. Catherine of Alexandria, the church was built in 1346 by King Casimir the Great. It is the oldest existing church of the Podhale region.

The church has been damaged by numerous fires and military attacks, and subsequently rebuilt and renovated. The interior retains its baroque character, especially in the altar and side chapels, although numerous pieces are replicas of wooden originals lost to fire. A painting of St. Catherine from 1892 dominates the main altar.

Education
Podhalańska Państwowa Wyższa Szkoła Zawodowa in Nowy Targ

Sport

Ice hockey
Podhale Nowy Targ

Floorball
KS Szarotka Nowy Targ
KS Górale Nowy Targ

The Conservation of Nature

Nature reserves
Bor na Czerwonem - a reserve in Nowy Targ where the protected Drosera rotundifolia, Mountain Pine and Black Grouse grow.

International relations

Twin towns — Sister cities
Nowy Targ is twinned with:
 Radevormwald, Germany
 Kežmarok, Slovakia
 Évry, France
 Roverbella, Italy

See also
 List of cities in Poland
 Gorals
 Podhale

References
Notes

External links

Nowy Targ - official homepage
 Nowy Targ Holocaust Memorial book (Hebrew, Yiddish and English)
 Jewish Community in Nowy Targ on Virtual Shtetl
 English translation of the Nowy Targ Yizkor Book
 Nice photos from Nowy Targ

Populated places established in the 13th century
Cities and towns in Lesser Poland Voivodeship
Nowy Targ County
Kraków Voivodeship (14th century – 1795)
Kingdom of Galicia and Lodomeria
Kraków Voivodeship (1919–1939)
Holocaust locations in Poland